Qazi Muhammad Sulaiman Salman Mansurpuri  also referred to as Qazi Muhammad Sulaiman Salman or  Qazi Muhammad Suleman Mansoorpuri (Born: 1867 AD, Mansurpur, Patiala State30 May 1930, Jeddah, Saudi Arabia AD, 1284 AH - 02 Muharram 1349 AH) was an Islamic scholar, biographer and historian. Sulaiman Mansoorpuri is best known for Rahmatul-lil-Alameen (Mercy for Mankind), the biography of the Islamic prophet Muhammad in three volumes. He was also session judge in Patiala State.

Early life and education 
Sulaiman Mansoorpuri was born in 1867 in Mansurpur (formerly state Patiala, princely state of the British Empire in India). He received his early education from his father Qazi Ahmad Shah. Sulaiman Mansoorpuri's father was a Deputy Tahsildar in Patiala State.

At the age of seventeen, Sulaiman Mansoorpuri completed Munshi Fazil from Government Mohindra College, Patiala and came first in the University of the Punjab examination. After completing his education Sulaiman Mansoorpuri then joined the Department of Education, Finance and Civil Affairs in the state of Patiala. Developing his skills and abilities, he became a Sessions Judge in 1924.

Lineage 
Muhammad Sulaiman bin Qazi Ahmad Shah bin Qazi Baqii Ballah bin Qazi Moizuddin Ahmad.

Qazi Peer Muhammad, ancestor of Muhammad Sulaiman, was a judge in Mughal Empire that's why most of member of this family were known as Qazi.

Death 
In 1930, Salman Mansoorpuri travelled to Jeddah, Saudi Arabia with Ghulam Rasool Mahr to perform Hajj. He died on 30 May 1930 while returning from Hajj.

Works 
Mansoorpuri has written books in Urdu and Arabic. His books include:
 Sabeel Al-irshaad
 Tayed al-Islam
 Ashabe Badr
Tareekh-ul-Mashaheer

Rahmatul-lil-Alameen (Mercy for Mankind) 
This is the popular book of Sulaiman. This is the biography of the Islamic prophet Muhammad in three volumes. First published in 1911, this book has been translated in various language including English.

Al-Jamal Wa Al-Kamal 
This book is the complete exegesis of Surah Yusuf.

See also 

 Abdullah Ropari
 Sanaullah Amritsari
 Abdul Mannan Wazirabadi
 Muhammad Ibrahim Mir Sialkoti

References

Bibliography 

 

1867 births
1930 deaths
Quranic exegesis scholars
People from Punjab, India
Punjabi people
Ahl-i Hadith people
People from Jalandhar district
19th-century Indian Muslims
20th-century Indian Muslims
Indian Sunni Muslim scholars of Islam